The Apocalypse of Thomas is a work from the New Testament apocrypha, apparently composed originally in Greek. It concerns the end of the world, and appears to be influenced by the Apocalypse of John (better known later as the Book of Revelation), although it is written in a less mystical and cosmic manner.  The Apocalypse of Thomas is the inspiration for the popular medieval millennial list Fifteen Signs before Doomsday.

Manuscript history and dating
From roughly 1600–1900, the Apocalypse of Thomas was only known to exist by hostile references to it in the sixth century Gelasian Decree, which condemned the work as apocrypha not to be read.  Since 1900, manuscripts have been discovered that have enabled scholars to piece together a history of the text.  These manuscripts are largely in Latin, notably a 9th century manuscript from Benediktbeuern Abbey, although one Anglo-Saxon language fragment has been discovered as well in the Vercelli Book.

The text was probably written in Greek between the second and the fourth century.  It was then independently copied and translated in Latin in Italy or North Africa; the varying translations of the same underlying work explain various differences in the text between manuscripts.  There are two recensions of the text, a longer and a shorter, with the shorter one containing an interpolation apparently written in the fifth century, attributed to the influence of Priscillianism and/or Manichaeism, hence its condemnation in the Gelasian Decree.  Likely other revisions and variations existed as well.

Content
The apocalypse is attributed to merely "Thomas", without clarifying which one.  Thomas the Apostle is one possibility, as is one of Mani's three closest disciples, who was named Thomas.  The work is not very long, with only 13 paragraphs in the short version, and 28 paragraphs in the longer version.  Thomas relates a vision by God describing the end of the world over a period of seven days, and what will happen on each.  On the eighth day, the elect are delivered up unto God, whereupon they rejoice over the destruction of the sinful mortal realm.

Related works
 writes that the author appears to be familiar with, or at least was influenced by, various other apocalyptic literature other than the Apocalypse of John, including the Assumption of Moses, the Ascension of Isaiah, and the Sibylline Oracles.

Influence
The Apocalypse of Thomas was widespread in Northwestern Europe, with manuscripts dating between the eighth and the eleventh century.  Despite the condemnation in the Gelasian Decree, this did not seem to curtail its popularity: the Apocalypse was most likely accepted as canonical "in certain parts of Western Christendom in the ninth and tenth centuries".

The interpolated version of the Apocalypse is notable for having inspired the Fifteen Signs before Doomsday, a list of fifteen signs given over fifteen days announcing Judgment Day, a visionary list which spread all over Europe and remained popular possibly into Shakespeare's day.

References

External links 
 , translation and commentary by M. R. James in the 1924 book The Apocryphal New Testament
 Apocalypse of Thomas at NASSCAL
 Codex Clm 4585, at the Bayerische Staatsbibliothek of Munich

Christian apocalyptic writings
Thomas